Pothyne multivittipennis is a species of beetle in the family Cerambycidae. It was described by Breuning in 1950.

References

multivittipennis
Beetles described in 1950